Fountain University is in Oke Osun after the Osun Osogbo sacred grove in Osogbo, Nigeria. It was established by the Nasrul-lahi-li Fatih (NASFAT) Society in 2007. It is a privately owned Islamic faith-based university in Osun State. Presently, the university has five colleges: College of Basic Medical and Health Science, College of Natural and Applied Science, College of Management and Social Sciences, College of Law, Postgraduate School. Colleges of Art, Engineering and Education are being proposed.

History

The formation of Nasrul-Lahi-Ii-Fatih Society of Nigeria NASFAT — the proprietor of Fountain University — was originally focused on prayer meetings for the Muslim elites, with a view to creating opportunity for them to, interact and rub minds with Islamic scholars and to enhance their knowledge about the principles and practices of Islam.

The desire of NASFAT to establish a university was borne out of its education policy and plan enunciated at its strategic retreat in Akodo, Lagos, in 2000. From this humble beginning, the society started a systematic process which led to the hosting of an academic summit of 30 distinguished academic personalities from where an 18-person planning committee emerged in January 2004.

Fountain University was granted an operational license as a Private University on May 17, 2007, by the federal government on the recommendations of the National Universities Commission. Following this achievement, a Fountain University strategic implementation committee was set up to serve as “in loco Council” to actualize the birth of the university. This committee worked tirelessly to put in place the facilities for the university to take-off. The committee was dissolved in September 2007 upon the inauguration of the Governing Council led by Professor N.O. Adedipe. The first Governing Council completed its first four years in September 2011 after which it was reconstituted.

Colleges
 College of Basic Medical and Health Science
 College of Natural and Applied Science
 College of Management and Social Science
 College of Law
 Postgraduate School

Vice-Chancellors 
The Vice-Chancellor is supported by two deputy vice-chancellors. Former and current persons who have fulfilled the position are:

References

External links 
Fountain University Official Website

Universities and colleges in Nigeria
Osogbo
Islamic universities and colleges in Nigeria
Educational institutions established in 2007
2007 establishments in Nigeria